Clint McCune (born April 26, 1973) is an American musician and activist in the Puget Sound area.

Biography 
McCune is one of three children born to Linda and Don McCune, a Seattle television personality, who is known for his Emmy award winning role as "Captain Puget" (1957–1966), and for writing and narrating the documentary series "Exploration Northwest" (1960–1981) on KOMO-TV in Seattle.

McCune graduated from Woodinville High School in 1991 where he studied theater and music. McCune was the drum major and played the trombone for the school's All-State band.

McCune attended the University of Evansville from 1992–1994 where he studied theater performance. In fall 1992, he spent a semester in Grantham, England at Harlaxton College and toured as a solo musician around the UK. During his time at Evansville, McCune wrote and recorded Dreamtown U.S.A..

McCune's father Don died in March 1993.

in 1999, while living on a sailboat on the intercostal waterways of the eastern seaboard, McCune and his sister Grace formed the band "Twirl". Twirl performed together until 2007 and released two live albums, "Across the Universe", recorded live at Victor's Coffee House in Redmond, and "Hope, Hum, Stomp, Strum", recorded at SoulFood Books and Cafe with violinist Joel Gamble.

From 2005–2013, McCune and his long-time partner, Sara Pelfrey, owned and operated a grassroots-inspired music venue and coffeeshop, SoulFood Books and Cafe, in Redmond, Washington, where he performed on the first Friday of each month. McCune created and hosted a long-running, well-attended monthly community-wide open mic, as well as stewarding a rich local music scene from this stage.

McCune served three terms on the City of Redmond Arts Commission from 2007-2013 and was appointed chairman in 2010.

In March 2011, McCune performed some of the highest elevation concerts ever in Nepal on the Everest Highway to raise global awareness for climate change. The tour included various Nepali musical artists including Mausami Gurung, Mingma Sherpa, DJ Tenzing, Gambu Sherpa, and Roj Moktan. During his tour in Nepal, McCune was invited to meet with the Prime Minister Jhala Nath Khanal. McCune appears in a book of these events, "Song of Chomolungma: A Musical Journey Along the Everest Highway" by Erika Klimecky.

In 2014, McCune starred in, and composed the soundtrack for, the independent short film, "Brother" directed by Captain Chambers.

On November 13, 2014, McCune was invited to perform the song "Yell Fire" with Michael Franti & Spearhead at The MacDonald Theater in Eugene, Oregon.

Discography

References

External links 
 www.clintmccune.com

1973 births
Living people